Stade Moulay Rachid is a multi-use stadium located in Laayoune, Morocco. It is used mostly for football matches. The stadium has a capacity of 5,000 people and is home the JS Massira football club of Laayoune.

External links 
 Soccerway

Football venues in Western Sahara
Buildings and structures in Laayoune